The Philadelphia White Stockings played in 1874 as a  member of the National Association of Professional Base Ball Players. They finished fourth in the league with a record of 29-29.

Regular season

Season standings

Record vs. opponents

Roster

Player stats

Batting
Note: G = Games played; AB = At bats; H = Hits; Avg. = Batting average; HR = Home runs; RBI = Runs batted in

Starting pitchers 
Note: G = Games pitched; IP = Innings pitched; W = Wins; L = Losses; ERA = Earned run average; SO = Strikeouts

References
1874 Philadelphia Whites season at Baseball Reference

Philadelphia White Stockings seasons
Philadelphia White Stockings Season, 1874
Philadelphia White Stockings